Fullertown is an unincorporated community in Geauga County, in the U.S. state of Ohio.

History
A post office called Fullertown was established in 1879, and remained in operation until 1906. The community was named for Thomas Fuller, an early settler.

References

Unincorporated communities in Geauga County, Ohio
Unincorporated communities in Ohio